The Last Few Beautiful Days is the ninth studio album by new wave band The Motels. Martha Davis's eldest daughter Maria inspired many of the songs on The Last Few Beautiful Days album, as she had died in 2016 after battling an opioid addiction.

Track listing

References 

2017 compilation albums
The Motels albums